The Order of the Million Elephants and the White Parasol, also called the Order of the Million Elephants and the White Umbrella ( Itsariyaphon Lan Sang Hom Khao), is the highest knighthood order of the Royal Family of Laos.

History 
The Order was founded on 1 May 1909 by King Sisavang Vong.

The name of the order reflected an old name of Laos, Lan Xang Hom Khao which means "million elephants and white umbrella".

The Royal system of Orders and Medals effectively ended with the fall of Laos in 1975. The Royal Orders, by their nature, remain the dynastic property of the Royal House of Laos in absentia, and are still awarded by the Royal House as a dynastic award. The honour is still awarded in recognition of dedicated services to charity and humanitarianism. All grades of the Order are approved for wear as a foreign order (i.e. after all British and other Commonwealth decorations) by Elizabeth II, Queen of the United Kingdom and the other Commonwealth realms, as it is on the "Schedule of Approved Countries and Awards".

Classes 
The Order consisted of the following classes, in descending order:
Grand Cross with Collar
Grand Cross (ປະຖະມາພອນ Pathamaphon)
Grand Officer (ທຸຕິຍາພອນ Thutiyaphon)
Commander (ຕະຕິຍາພອນ Tatiyaphon)
Officer (ຈະຕູດຖາພອນ Jatutthaphon)
Knight (ປັນຈະມາພອນ Panchamaphon)

Insignia 
The ribbon on which the Order is worn is red, ornamented with a yellow geometrical design.

Notable recipients 
Crown of Nepal
Mahendra, King of Nepal (1955–1972) (1970)
 Ratna, Queen consort of Nepal (1960-1972) (1970)
Birendra, King of Nepal (1972–2001) when Crown Prince (1970)
Aishwarya, Queen consort of Nepal (1972-2001) when Crown Princess (1970)
Crown of Thailand
Bhumibol Adulyadej, King of Thailand (1963)
Sirikit, Queen consort of Thailand (1963)
Sarit Thanarat, Prime Minister of Thailand
Thanom Kittikachorn, Prime Minister of Thailand
Crown of Cambodia
Sisowath Monivong, King of Cambodia (1927-1941)
Norodom Suramarit, King of Cambodia (1955-1960) (1955)
Norodom Sihanouk, King of Cambodia (1941-1955) / (1993-2004) 
Crown of Vietnam
Bảo Đại, Emperor of Vietnam (1926-1945)
Bảo Long, Crown Prince of Vietnam (1939-2007)
French Republic
Charles de Gaulle
Marcelle Lafont
Jean de Lattre de Tassigny
Philippe Leclerc de Hauteclocque
Adrien Conus
René Joyeuse
René Gaurand
Roger Faulques
Louis Renault (industrialist)

Others
Hamengkubuwano VIII
James Greenway
Eisaku Sato
BG. Dean Murphy USV-JSC

Notes

External link

Orders, decorations, and medals of Laos
Orders of chivalry awarded to heads of state, consorts and sovereign family members
Awards established in 1909